Libby Morris (born 1930) is a Canadian clown and actress. She appeared in several BBC radio shows of the 1950s and moved into TV and film from the 1960s onwards. She then moved on to London, England, where she starred in her own show doing impersonations.

Family
Morris and her husband Murray Kash raised their daughter, Marcia Kash, in Hampstead, London, where they lived together for many years. They later returned to Canada where they remained until Kash died in March 2009. In 1981, they appeared together on stage in Hampstead in Morris's play A Girl's Best Friend. They often participated in fundraising shows for the Stars Foundation for Cerebral Palsy.

Radio appearances
1955 The Jack Jackson Show
1956 Meet Libby Morris
1956 Two's Company

Filmography

Film

TV appearances

External links

Libby Morris - It's My Life (1967-London) http://www.bazboothzone.co.uk/music.php?item=308

References

Canadian clowns
Canadian film actresses
Living people
Canadian expatriates in England
1930 births